William Lewis Thomas (30 June 1913 – 1 February 1995) born in Ystradgynlais, was a Welsh rugby union and rugby league footballer who played in the 1930s and 1940s. He played club level rugby union (RU) for Ystradgynlais RFC and Neath RFC, as a Scrum-half, and club level rugby league (RL) for Ystradgynlais RLFC. He captained Ystradgynlais RFC in 1937/38, and played for Neath RFC between the years of 1938 and 1941, and then for a further season in 1946. He was one half of the then famous pre-war halfback partnership, alongside Welsh international outside half W. E. Jones, he died in Ystradgynlais.

He played in two final Welsh trials but lost out on selection to Swansea Scrum Half Haydn Tanner on both occasions.

Thomas also played rugby league for his home village team of Ystradgynlais RLFC in 1949. Ystradgynlais RLFC played in the Welsh League (1949–55), and they also played host to St. Helens, Wakefield Trinity and Halifax.

1913 births
1995 deaths
Neath RFC players
Rugby articles needing expert attention
Rugby league players from Powys
Rugby union players from Ystradgynlais
Rugby union scrum-halves
Welsh rugby league players
Welsh rugby union players
Ystradgynlais RFC players